Nora Gold is a Canadian author and the founder and editor of Jewish Fiction .net. Previously, she was an associate professor of social work.

Early life and education 
Gold grew up in Montreal, Quebec, the daughter of the late Alan B. Gold, former chief justice of the Superior Court of Quebec, and Lynn Lubin Gold, a teacher of English literature at Dawson College. Gold holds a bachelor of social work from McGill University and master's degree and doctorate in social work from the University of Toronto. She received seven funded research grants, two from the Social Science and Humanities Research Council of Canada and two from the Halbert Centre for Canadian Studies for international Canada-Israel collaborations.

Career

Literary 
Gold's first book, Marrow and Other Stories, was released in 1998 by Warwick Publishing. It received a Canadian Jewish Book Award and was shortlisted for the Danuta Gleed Literary Award. In 2014, Dundurn Press released Gold's first novel, Fields of Exile, which dealt with the subjects of anti-Zionism and anti-Semitism. It won the 2015 Canadian Jewish Literary Award for Best Novel and was praised by Cynthia Ozick and Phyllis Chesler. Two notable reviews of Fields of Exile were written by Ruth Wisse in Mosaic Magazine and by Goldie Morgentaler in Nashim: A Journal of Jewish Women's Studies & Gender Issues. Gold's second novel and third book, The Dead Man, was published in 2016 through Inanna Publications. It received international notice as well as a translation grant from the Canada Council for the Arts, which resulted in the 2019 release of The Dead Man published as Ha’ish Hamet in Hebrew. The book was launched on August 14, 2019 at the Official Residence in Tel Aviv of Deborah Lyons, the Canadian ambassador to Israel.

Gold is the founding editor-in-chief of Jewish Fiction .net, an online journal that publishes international Jewish fiction, either written in English or translated into English from different languages.

Gold is also the founder and coordinator of the Wonderful Women Writers Series at Toronto Public Library (Deer Park branch).

Social activism 
Gold is a community activist focused primarily, though not exclusively, on organizations working in support of a progressive, socially just Israel. Gold co-founded the New Israel Fund of Canada (NIFC) in 1982, an international organization committed to furthering pluralism, civil rights, democracy, and social equality in Israel. In 1996, Gold co-founded Canadian Friends of Givat Haviva, a charity that promotes tolerance and mutual understanding between Jewish and Arab youth in Israel. Gold also founded JSpaceCanada in 2011, in order to provide Canadians with an alternative to both the extreme pro-Israel right and the extreme anti-Israel left. Gold has been formally recognized by the Toronto Jewish Community as an Outstanding Volunteer.

Academic 
From 1990-2000, Gold was a tenured associate professor of social work at McMaster University. Gold left full-time academia in 2000 to focus more time on her literary career. From 2000-2018 (the year it closed) Gold was affiliated with the OISE/University of Toronto Centre for Women's Studies in Education, first as an associate scholar and then as its writer-in-residence.

Personal life 
Gold is married to David Solomon Weiss, younger brother of the rabbi Avi Weiss, and together they have a son, Joseph Weissgold. The couple are not Orthodox but consider themselves traditional and egalitarian. They divide their time between Toronto and Jerusalem.

References

Living people
20th-century Canadian short story writers
21st-century Canadian novelists
Canadian women short story writers
Canadian women novelists
Writers from Montreal
21st-century Canadian short story writers
21st-century Canadian women writers
Jewish women writers
Writers from Toronto
Jewish novelists
20th-century Canadian women writers
Jewish Canadian writers
Activists from Montreal
Year of birth missing (living people)
McGill University alumni
University of Toronto alumni
Academic staff of McMaster University